Conquest is a 1983 fantasy film directed by Lucio Fulci.  The film plot involves Ilias (Andrea Occhipinti) a young man who  battles monsters and mutants on his journey to manhood. Conquest was reviewed by both AllMovie and the Monthly Film Bulletin, who noted the films low budget and derivative nature, while finding the film to be surprisingly entertaining despite its negative aspects.

Plot 

In a mystical land, a handsome youth named Ilias embarks on a quest, leaving behind his family in his paradise home for a fog-shrouded wilderness. He receives a magic bow from his father to mark his passage into manhood. Ilias enters a strange land where small tribes are terrorized by werewolf-like creatures, acting under orders of Ocron, a nude masked female of great evil. While in a drugged state, Ocron sees a faceless youth with a magic bow who dares to attack her. Ocron sends her werewolf servants out to look for the man.

A little later, a gang of Ocron's marauders tries to steal the bow and capture Ilias. But they are foiled when a rugged man dressed in animal skins leaps to his rescue, beating up the marauders and forcing them to flee. The man introduces himself as Mace, a nomadic outlaw. After admiring the younger man's magic bow, Mace teams up with him on his quest to rid the land of evil. He affects a dismissal of human affairs, but soon the two are fast friends. Mace reveals that he has contempt for people but cares for animals and bonds with many species.  In an example of this contempt, while training with the bow, Mace kills a random hunter, and both he and Ilias steal the dying man's game.

Next, Ocron sends Fado, the leader of her brutal werewolves, to capture Ilias and the magic bow. Ilias and Mace stop for the night to rest and eat with a small tribe in caves and offer them a fresh animal kill as a gift. Ilias recognizes a young girl of the tribe seen earlier in the journey, and the two of them go off together. Suddenly, masked attackers kill the girl and abduct Ilias, stealing his bow. Mace tracks them down to a camp and rescues his young friend in a long and bloody fight.

At Ocron's lair, Fado gets burned on a giant hot plate as punishment for failing to capture the magic bow. Ocron summons the Great Zora, a spirit who resides in the body of a white wolf. She offers herself, body and soul, to Zora if he can kill Ilias.

Having found out the person responsible for all this, Ilias declares that he will punish Ocron for her evil crimes over the land and encourages Mace to join him. Mace refuses, saying that he and Ocron stay clear of each other, for she is too powerful to combat. Mace agrees to escort Ilias as far as the seashore, from where he must sail to Ocron's fortress. On the way, hundreds of tiny arrows assail the two of them. One arrow hits Ilias in the arm, soon breaking out in hideous boils. Mace sails with him along the coast to a place where a unique plant grows that will cure his affliction of the poisoned arrow. Leaving his friend on the boat, Mace jumps ashore and soon does battle with grotesque zombies and afterward does battle with a double of himself. Mace wins the fight, and his double is revealed as Zora, who disappears after reverting to his humanoid form.

The plant works, and Ilias is restored to health. But Ilias has become disenchanted and decides to sail home, pleading with Mace to go with him. Mace refuses and also refuses to take ownership of the magic bow. No sooner have they parted when Mace is attacked by a band of strange, cobweb-covered creatures. They tie him to a wooden cross and interrogate him about the whereabouts of Ilias. Mace refuses to cooperate. Ilias saves Mace from the monsters with his magic bow and arrows. But the captive Mace falls off a cliff and into the sea during the rescue. Super-intelligent dolphins bite at the ropes that tie Mace to the cross and he is washed ashore, barely conscious. Ilias arrives and tells Mace that he has had a change of heart and decided to return to be with his friend and defeat Ocron.

That night, Ilias is grabbed and sucked down into a lair inhabited by subterranean monsters. When Mace follows, he is forced to battle a few of them while chasing after Ilias. Venturing further into the caves, Mace finds Ilias, hanging upside down with his head cut off. Zora delivers the severed head of Ilias to Ocron and the magic bow. Mace lights a funeral pyre for his dead friend. Ilias' spirit speaks to Mace inside his mind and tells him to anoint himself with the ashes. This will pass along the power Cronos gave to Ilias, and the magic bow will be Mace's.

The next morning, Mace confronts Ocron in her lair and the bow suddenly flies out of her hands, and into his. He takes on all of Ocron's surviving werewolves, shooting them with his magic arrows from the bow. Mace fires a magic arrow at Ocron, which penetrates her mask, revealing the hideously ugly face of a ghoul atop her smooth, nubile body. As Ocron dies, her dead body transforms into a wolf, which runs off into the wilderness with the white wolf Zora. The final scene has Mace, alone again, walking into the wild to continue Ilias's quest to rid the land of evil.

Cast
Andrea Occhipinti as Ilias
Jorge Rivero as Mace
Conrado San Martín as Zora
Sabrina Siani as Ocron
 José Gras Palau as Fado
Violeta Cela as a sacrificial victim
 Gioia Maria Scola

Production
The film's original Italian shooting title was Mace, il fuorilegge. The film was an Italian-Spanish-Mexican co-production filmed in Mexico, Sardinia and Rome, Italy

Fulci had signed a two-picture contract with the producer, Giovanni Di Clemente, but after the two had some disagreements during the making of Conquest, Fulci left immediately after shooting the film and refused to complete the contract. Di Clemente sued Fulci in court but lost, the judge opining that Fulci could not be compelled to work.

Release
Conquest was released on June 2, 1983 in Italy (running 80 minutes), and on August 19, 1983 in Spain under the title La conquista de la tierra perdida. Italian film historian 
Roberto Curti described the film as a box office bomb in Italy where it grossed less than 100 million Italian lire.

Conquest was later released theatrically in the United States in April 1984 with a 89 minute running time, and in the United Kingdom in May 1984 with a running time of 84 minutes. It was later shown in Mexico on August 15, 1985.

Reception 
In a contemporary review, the Monthly Film Bulletin referred to the film as a "low-budget, deliriously magpie mix of Conan the Barbarian, Quest for Fire and Raiders of the Lost Ark with a few zombies—Fulci's Forte—thrown in for good measure." The review stated that despite "excessive gore," "manifestly implausible plot" and "patchy special effects," that the film was "actually very enjoyable." The review also commented on Claudio Simonetti's score, finding it "wonderfully inappropriate" and reminiscent of Simonetti's work in Goblin and on the scores for Deep Red and Dawn of the Dead.

Jeremy Wheeler (AllMovie) gave the film two stars out of five, while noting that "even with the shoddy production values and downright embarrassing monster masks, it is what it is—a psychedelic C-Grade fantasy flick by the master of Italian gore done in an incredibly strange time and place in movie history—Italy in the early '80s. Some might call it junk, but those with their tongue planted firmly in cheek will call it a schlock masterpiece."

In his analysis of the film, Louis Paul described the film as "far better than similar Italian sword-and-sorcery contrivances of the time." While criticizing part of the dialogue, he particularly praised the cinematography and the performance of the main actor Jorge Rivero.

References

Footnotes

Sources

External links 
 

1983 films
Films directed by Lucio Fulci
Italian fantasy films
Mexican fantasy films
Spanish fantasy films
1980s Italian-language films
1983 fantasy films
Sword and sorcery films
1980s Spanish-language films
Films scored by Claudio Simonetti
Peplum films
Sword and sandal films
1980s exploitation films
1980s Italian films
1980s Mexican films